Raúl Alfredo Maradona, also known as Lalo Maradona (born 29 November 1966) is an Argentine former professional footballer who played as a striker.

Career

Maradona played in Argentina for Boca Juniors, in Spain for Granada, and in Peru for Deportivo Municipal; he also played in Japan and Canada and Venezuela. In 1993, he went to North America to sign with Fort Lauderdale Strikers of the American Professional Soccer League. In 1995, he signed with Toronto Italia of the Canadian National Soccer League. The following season his team won the regular season championship, and reached the CNSL Championship final where the club faced St. Catharines Wolves, and won the series 11–0 on aggregate. After the conclusion of the CNSL season he signed with the Toronto Shooting Stars of the National Professional Soccer League, where he appeared in 27 matches and recorded 12 goals. Following the conclusion of the indoor season Maradona returned to the CNSL and signed with North York Talons.

In 1998 he joined Peruvian side for Deportivo Municipal, where he was greeted as a star but only played a few games. He subsequently played in the Canadian Professional Soccer League with Toronto Olympians.

Personal life

Maradona is the brother of fellow players Diego (1960–2020) and Hugo (1969–2021). Their father Diego Maradona (known as "Chitoro"; 1927–2015), who worked at a chemicals factory, was of Guaraní (Indigenous) and Spanish (Basque) descent, and their mother Dalma Salvadora Franco (known as "Doña Tota"; 1930–2011), was of Italian descent.

References

Sources
El hermano malo, double edition: Lalo y Hugo Maradona
La historia de "Lalo" Maradona

1966 births
Living people
Sportspeople from Lanús
Argentine footballers
Boca Juniors footballers
Granada CF footballers
Deportivo Municipal footballers
Association football forwards
Deportivo Laferrere footballers
Deportivo Italia players
Avispa Fukuoka players
Toronto Italia players
Toronto (Mississauga) Olympians players
Canadian National Soccer League players
Fort Lauderdale Strikers (1988–1994) players
Toronto Shooting Stars players
North York Astros players
Buffalo Blizzard players
American Professional Soccer League players
National Professional Soccer League (1984–2001) players
Canadian Soccer League (1998–present) players
Argentine people of Guaraní descent
Argentine people of Italian descent
Argentine people of Basque descent
Maradona family
Argentine expatriate footballers
Argentine expatriate sportspeople in Spain
Expatriate footballers in Spain
Argentine expatriates in Japan
Expatriate footballers in Japan
Argentine expatriates in the United States
Expatriate soccer players in the United States
Argentine expatriates in Canada
Expatriate soccer players in Canada
Argentine expatriates in Peru
Expatriate footballers in Peru
Argentine expatriate sportspeople in Venezuela
Expatriate footballers in Venezuela